Pingasa subpurpurea  is a moth of the family Geometridae first described by William Warren in 1897. It is found on Borneo, the Philippines and Sulawesi.

References

External links
 

moths described in 1897
Pseudoterpnini